The Pangwa are a Bantu ethnolinguistic group based in the Kipengere Range on the eastern shore of Lake Malawi, in the Ludewa District of Njombe Region in southern Tanzania.  In 2002 the Pangwa population was estimated to number 95,000 . The Pangwa language is a member of the Bantu family. 

Alternate names for Pangwa are Ekipangwa and Kipangwa.

See also 
 Nena people

References

Ethnic groups in Tanzania
Indigenous peoples of East Africa
Languages of Tanzania
Northeast Bantu languages